Lights Out is the second album by the UK band, Antimatter, released in 2003.

Track listing

Credits
Duncan Patterson - bass guitar, acoustic guitar, electric guitar, keyboards, programming, artwork, production, vocals
Mick Moss - bass guitar, acoustic guitar, electric guitar, keyboards, production, vocals
Hayley Windsor - guest vocals on tracks 1, 2, 3
Michelle Richfield - guest vocals on tracks 4, 5, 7
James SK Wān – bamboo flute
Jamie Cavanagh - additional percussion: 
Stefano Soffia - production
Stefano Soffia - mixing engineer
Jamie Cavanagh - additional mixing 
Fergal Davis - mastering 
Adrian Owens - artwork and layout designer

References

2003 albums
Antimatter (band) albums
The End Records albums